Peter Garland may refer to:

 Peter Garland (composer) (born 1952), American composer
 Peter Garland (footballer) (born 1971), English former footballer
 Peter A. Garland (1923–2005), U.S. Representative from Maine